

This is a list of the Pennsylvania state historical markers in Dauphin County.

This is intended to be a complete list of the official state historical markers placed in Dauphin County, Pennsylvania by the Pennsylvania Historical and Museum Commission (PHMC). The locations of the historical markers, as well as the latitude and longitude coordinates as provided by the PHMC's database, are included below when available. There are 81 historical markers located in Dauphin County.

Historical markers

See also

List of Pennsylvania state historical markers
National Register of Historic Places listings in Dauphin County, Pennsylvania

References

External links
Pennsylvania Historical Marker Program
Pennsylvania Historical & Museum Commission

.Pennsylvania state historical markers
.State historical markers
Dauphin County
L
Historical markers
L
Pennsylvania state historical markers
Pennsylvania state historical markers
Tourist attractions in Dauphin County, Pennsylvania